The Masked Rider is a 1941 American Western film directed by Ford Beebe and written by Sherman L. Lowe and Victor McLeod. The film stars Johnny Mack Brown, Fuzzy Knight, Nell O'Day, Grant Withers, Virginia Carroll and Guy D'Ennery. The film was released on October 24, 1941, by Universal Pictures.

Plot

Cast        
Johnny Mack Brown as Larry Prescott
Fuzzy Knight as Patches McQuilt
Nell O'Day as Jean Malone
Grant Withers as Douglas
Virginia Carroll as Margarita Valdez
Guy D'Ennery as Don Sebastian Valdez
Carmella Cansino as Carmencita 
Roy Barcroft as Luke
Dick Botiller as Pedro
Fred Cordova as Pablo
Al Haskell as Jose
Rico De Montez as Manuel
Bob O'Connor as Mine Guard

References

External links
 

1941 films
American black-and-white films
American Western (genre) films
1941 Western (genre) films
Universal Pictures films
Films directed by Ford Beebe
1940s English-language films
1940s American films